is a Japanese tarento, actress, Reserve Self-Defense Official, marathon runner and ultramarathon runner. She is represented with N Force Promotion from Sun Music Production.

Fukushima graduated from Hokkaido Hakodate Technical High School.

Main results/records

Filmography

TV programmes

Radio programmes

Advertisements

Works

CD

DVD

Photo albums

References

External links
 
Affiliated office profile 
Victor Site 
Wakana Fukushima no "Keirei shimāsu" 

Japanese television personalities
Japanese idols
Japan Ground Self-Defense Force personnel
People from Hakodate
1982 births
Living people
Japanese female long-distance runners